Gonggong (formally 225088 Gonggong; provisional designation ) is a dwarf planet, a member of the scattered disc beyond Neptune. According to Deep Ecliptic Survey Gonggong is in a 3:10 orbital resonance with Neptune, in which it completes three orbits around the Sun for every ten orbits completed by Neptune. Gonggong was discovered in July 2007 by American astronomers Megan Schwamb, Michael Brown, and David Rabinowitz at the Palomar Observatory, and the discovery was announced in January 2009.

It may be sufficiently massive to be plastic under its own gravity and therefore a dwarf planet. Gonggong's large mass makes retention of a tenuous atmosphere of methane just possible, though such an atmosphere would slowly escape into space. The object is named after Gònggōng, a Chinese water god responsible for chaos, floods and the tilt of the Earth. The name was chosen by its discoverers in 2019, when they hosted an online poll for the general public to help choose a name for the object, and the name Gonggong won.

Gonggong is red, likely due to the presence of organic compounds called tholins on its surface. Water ice is also present on its surface, which hints at a brief period of cryovolcanic activity in the distant past. With a rotation period around 22 hours, Gonggong rotates slowly compared to other trans-Neptunian objects, which typically have periods less than 12 hours. The slow rotation of Gonggong may have been caused by tidal forces from its natural satellite, named Xiangliu.

History

Discovery 

Gonggong was discovered by American astronomers Megan Schwamb, Michael Brown and David Rabinowitz on 17 July 2007. The survey was designed to detect the movements of objects out to at least 1,000 AU from the Sun. Schwamb identified Gonggong by comparing images using the blinking technique. In the discovery images, Gonggong appeared to move slowly, suggesting that it is a distant object. The discovery was part of Schwamb's doctoral thesis. At that time, Schwamb was a graduate student of Michael Brown at the California Institute of Technology.

Gonggong was formally announced in a Minor Planet Electronic Circular on 7 January 2009. It was then given the provisional designation  because it was discovered during the second half of July 2007. The last letter and numbers of its designation indicate that it is the 267th object discovered during the latter half of July. , it has been observed 230 times over 13 oppositions, and has been identified in two precovery images, with the earliest image taken by the La Silla Observatory on 19 August 1985.

Name and symbol 
The object is named after Gonggong, a water god in Chinese mythology. Gonggong is depicted as having a copper-and-iron, red-haired human head (or sometimes torso) and the body or tail of a serpent. Gonggong was responsible for creating chaos and catastrophe, causing flooding and tilting the Earth, until he was sent into exile. Gonggong is often accompanied by his minister, Xiangliu, a nine-headed poisonous snake monster who was also responsible for causing flooding and destruction.

Before its official naming, Gonggong was the largest known unnamed object in the Solar System. Initially after the discovery of Gonggong, Brown nicknamed the object "Snow White" for its presumed white color based on his assumption that it may be a member of the icy Haumea collisional family. However, Gonggong turned out to be very red in color, comparable to Quaoar, so the nickname was dropped. On 2 November 2009, two years after its discovery, the Minor Planet Center assigned the minor planet number 225088 to Gonggong.

Upon the discovery and announcement of Gonggong, Brown did not consider naming it, as he regarded it to be an unremarkable object, despite its large size. Brown later declared in 2011 that he now had enough information to justify giving it a name, in consideration of the discovery of water ice and the possibility of methane on its surface, which made it noteworthy enough to warrant further study. Following the Kepler spacecraft's large revision of Gonggong's size in 2016, Schwamb justified that Gonggong was eligible for naming, an acknowledgement of its large size and that the characteristics of Gonggong were known with enough certainty for a name to be given to reflect them.

In 2019, the discoverers of Gonggong hosted an online poll for the general public to choose between three possible names: Gonggong (Chinese), Holle (German), and Vili (Norse). These were selected by the discoverers in accordance with the International Astronomical Union's (IAU's) minor planet naming criteria, which state that objects with orbits like that of Gonggong must be given names related to mythological figures that are associated with creation. The three options were chosen because they were associated with water, ice, snow, and the color red—all characteristics of Gonggong—and because they had associated figures that could later provide a name for Gonggong's satellite. The name for Gonggong's satellite was not chosen by the hosts of the naming poll, as this privilege is reserved for its discoverers.

Having gained 46 percent of the 280,000 votes, on 29 May 2019, the discovery team announced Gonggong as the winning name. The name was proposed to the IAU's Committee on Small Body Nomenclature (CSBN), which is responsible for naming minor planets. The name was accepted by the CSBN and was announced by the Minor Planet Center on 5 February 2020.

Planetary symbols are no longer much used in astronomy, so Gonggong never received a symbol in the astronomical literature. The symbol was designed by Denis Moskowitz, a software engineer in Massachusetts; it combines the Chinese character 共 gòng with a snake's tail.

Orbit 

The orbit of Gonggong is highly inclined to the ecliptic, with an orbital inclination 30.7 degrees. Its orbit is also highly eccentric, with a measured orbital eccentricity of 0.50. Gonggong reached perihelion in 1857, and is currently moving farther from the Sun, toward its aphelion.

The period, inclination and eccentricity of Gonggong's orbit are all rather extreme compared to other large bodies in the Solar system. Its 31° inclination is second, after 44° for Eris, and its 0.50 eccentricity is also (a rather distant) second, after Sedna at 0.84.

The Minor Planet Center lists it as a scattered disc object for its eccentric and distant orbit. The Deep Ecliptic Survey shows the orbit of Gonggong to be in a 3:10 resonance with Neptune; Gonggong completes three orbits around the Sun for every ten orbits completed by Neptune.

It has been farther from the Sun than Sedna since 2013, and it will surpass Eris in distance by 2045. Gonggong will reach aphelion by 2134.

Brightness 
Gonggong has an absolute magnitude (H) of 2.34, which makes it the seventh-brightest trans-Neptunian object known. The Minor Planet Center and the Jet Propulsion Laboratory Small-Body Database assume a brighter absolute magnitude of 1.6 and 1.8, respectively, which would make it the fifth brightest trans-Neptunian object.

Being 88 AU from the Sun, the apparent magnitude of Gonggong is only 21.5, and so it is too dim to be seen from Earth with the naked eye. Although closer to the Sun than the dwarf planet Eris, Gonggong appears dimmer, as Eris has a higher albedo and an apparent magnitude of 18.8.

Physical characteristics

Surface and spectra 

The surface of Gonggong has an albedo (reflectivity) of 0.14. The reflectance spectrum of Gonggong was first measured in 2011 at near-infrared wavelengths, with the Folded port InfraRed Echellette (FIRE) spectrograph on the Magellan Baade Telescope at the Las Campanas Observatory in Chile. Gonggong's spectrum exhibits a strong red spectral slope along with broad absorption bands at wavelengths of 1.5 μm and 2 μm, meaning that Gonggong reflects more light at these wavelengths. Additional photometric measurements from the Hubble Space Telescope's Wide Field Camera 3 instrument display similar absorption bands at 1.5 μm, which are characteristic features of water ice, a substance often found on large Kuiper belt objects. The presence of water ice on the surface of Gonggong implies a brief period of cryovolcanism in the distant past, when water erupted from its interior, deposited onto its surface, and subsequently froze.

Gonggong is among the reddest trans-Neptunian objects known, especially in the visible and near-infrared. Its red color is unexpected for an object with a substantial amount of water ice on its surface, which are typically neutral in color, hence why Gonggong was initially nicknamed "Snow White". Gonggong's color implies that methane is present on its surface, although it was not directly detected in the spectrum of Gonggong due to the low signal-to-noise ratio of the data. The presence of methane frost would account for its color, as a result of the photolysis of methane by solar radiation and cosmic rays producing reddish organic compounds known as tholins. Observations of Gonggong's near-infrared spectrum in 2015 revealed an absorption feature at 2.27 μm, indicating the presence of methanol along with its irradiation products on its surface. Methanol is expected to brighten Gonggong's surface, although the irradiation of water ice may account for its present dark surface.

Gonggong is large enough to be able to retain trace amounts of volatile methane on its surface, even when at its closest distance to the Sun (33.7 AU), where temperatures are higher than that of Quaoar. In particular, the large size of Gonggong means that it is likely to retain trace amounts of other volatiles, including ammonia, carbon monoxide, and possibly nitrogen, which almost all trans-Neptunian objects lose over the course of their existence. Like Quaoar, Gonggong is expected to be near the mass limit at which it is able to retain those volatile materials on its surface.

Atmosphere 

The presence of tholins on the surface of Gonggong implies the possible existence of a tenuous methane atmosphere, analogous to Quaoar. Although Gonggong occasionally comes closer to the Sun than Quaoar, where it becomes warm enough that a methane atmosphere should evaporate, its larger mass could make the retention of methane just possible. During aphelion, methane along with other volatiles would condense on Gonggong's surface, allowing for long-term irradiation that would otherwise result in a decrease in surface albedo. The lower surface albedo would contribute to the loss of highly volatile materials such as nitrogen, as a lower albedo corresponds to more light being absorbed by the surface rather than being reflected, thus resulting in greater surface heating. Hence, the nitrogen content of Gonggong's atmosphere is expected to be depleted to trace amounts while methane is likely retained.

Gonggong is thought to have had cryovolcanic activity along with a more substantial atmosphere shortly after its formation. Such cryovolcanic activity is expected to have been brief, and the resulting atmosphere gradually escaped over time. Volatile gases, such as nitrogen and carbon monoxide, were lost, while less volatile gases such as methane are likely to remain in its present tenuous atmosphere.

Size 

This would make Gonggong the fifth-largest trans-Neptunian object, after Pluto, Eris, Haumea and Makemake.

The International Astronomical Union (IAU) has not addressed the possibility of officially accepting additional dwarf planets since the acceptance of Makemake and Haumea in 2008, prior to the announcement of Gonggong in 2009. Despite not satisfying the IAU's criterion of having an absolute magnitude brighter than +1, Gonggong is large enough to be considered a dwarf planet by several astronomers. However, Iapetus is not in equilibrium despite being  in diameter, so this remains just a possibility.

A survey led by a team of astronomers using the European Space Agency's Herschel Space Observatory in 2012 determined its diameter to be , based on the thermal properties of Gonggong observed in the far infrared range. This measurement is consistent with Brown's estimate.

In 2016, combined observations from the Kepler spacecraft and archival thermal emission data from Herschel suggested that Gonggong was much larger than previously thought, giving a size estimate of  based on an assumed equator-on view and a lower estimated albedo of 0.089. This would have made Gonggong the third-largest trans-Neptunian object after Eris and Pluto, larger than Makemake. These observations of Gonggong were part of the Kepler spacecraft's K2 mission which includes studying small Solar System bodies. With this size estimate, Gonggong is again thought to be the fifth-largest trans-Neptunian object.

Mass, density and rotation 

Gonggong is the fifth most massive trans-Neptunian object, after Eris, Pluto, Haumea, and Makemake. Due to its large size, mass, and density, Gonggong is expected to be in hydrostatic equilibrium, taking the shape of a MacLaurin spheroid that is slightly flattened due to its rotation.

The rotation period of Gonggong was first measured in March 2016, through observations of variations in its brightness with the Kepler space telescope. Gonggong's light curve amplitude as observed by Kepler is small, only varying in brightness by about 0.09 magnitudes. The small light curve amplitude of Gonggong indicates that it is being viewed at a pole-on configuration, further evidenced by the observed inclined orbit of its satellite. Based on a best-fit model for its rotation pole orientation, the value of  hours is thought to be the more plausible one. Gonggong rotates slowly compared to other trans-Neptunian objects, which usually have periods between 6 and 12 hours. Due to its slow rotation, it is expected to have a low oblateness of 0.03 or 0.007, for rotation periods of 22.4 or 44.81 hours, respectively.

Satellite 

Following the March 2016 discovery that Gonggong was an unusually slow rotator, the possibility was raised that a satellite may have slowed it down via tidal forces. The indications of a possible satellite orbiting Gonggong led Csaba Kiss and his team to analyze archival Hubble observations of Gonggong. Their analysis of Hubble images taken on 18 September 2010 revealed a faint satellite orbiting Gonggong at a distance of at least . The discovery was announced in a Division for Planetary Sciences meeting on 17 October 2016. On 5 February 2020 the satellite was officially named Xiangliu, after the nine-headed poisonous snake monster that accompanied Gonggong in Chinese mythology. This naming came at the same time that Gonggong itself was officially named.

Exploration 
It was calculated by planetary scientist Amanda Zangari that a flyby mission to Gonggong would take a minimum of over 20 years with current rocket capabilities. A flyby mission could take just under 25 years using a Jupiter gravity assist, based on a launch date of 2030 or 2031. Gonggong would be approximately 95 AU from the Sun when the spacecraft arrives.

See also 
 List of gravitationally rounded objects of the Solar System
 List of Solar System objects most distant from the Sun
 List of possible dwarf planets

Notes

References

External links 

 Precovery Images of Gonggong
 Gonggong's minor planet designation number
 Hubble images of Gonggong taken on 18 September 2010
 Hubble images of Gonggong taken in 2017
 The redemption of Snow White (Part 1) (Mike Brown blog 9 August 2011)
 Discovery Circumstances: Numbered Minor Planets (225001)-(230000) – Minor Planet Center
 Give Dwarf Planet 2007 OR10 the Real Name It Deserves Already – WIRED article by Emma Grey Ellis
 
 

 
225088
225088
Discoveries by Megan E. Schwamb
Discoveries by David L. Rabinowitz
Discoveries by Michael E. Brown
Named minor planets
Binary trans-Neptunian objects
Dwarf planets
20070717